Cheape is a surname. Notable people with the surname include:

 Eric Cheape (1885–1973), American college football player
 John Cheape (1792–1875), Scottish general
 Lady Griselda Cheape (1865–1934), anti-suffrage campaigner
 Leslie Cheape (1882–1916), English soldier and polo player